Nicholas Joseph Lorusso (born November 1967), is a New Orleans, Louisiana, lawyer and politician who served as a Republican member of the Louisiana House of Representatives.

Initially elected in 2007, Lorusso was re-elected in 2011, but was defeated in the primary in a bid for re-election in 2015.

References

 
 

 

1967 births
Living people
Republican Party members of the Louisiana House of Representatives
Politicians from New Orleans
Jesuit High School (New Orleans) alumni
University of New Orleans alumni
Louisiana State University Law Center alumni
United States Air Force officers
Lawyers from New Orleans
American people of Italian descent